The first-ever International Indian Film Academy Awards is officially known as 1st IIFA Awards. The award ceremony was held in 2000 at the Millennium Dome in London. It took place on 24 June 2000. During the ceremony, IIFA Awards were awarded in 26 competitive categories. 

The ceremony was held at the Millennium Dome and was co-hosted by Yukta Mookhey and Anupam Kher.

Hum Dil De Chuke Sanam led the ceremony with 21 nominations, followed by Taal with 12 nominations and Sarfarosh with 9 nominations.

Hum Dil De Chuke Sanam won 11 awards, including Best Film, Best Director (for Sanjay Leela Bhansali) and Best Actress (for Aishwarya Rai), thus becoming the most-awarded film at the ceremony.

Aishwarya Rai received dual nominations for Best Actress for her performances in Hum Dil De Chuke Sanam and Taal, winning for the former.

Anil Kapoor received dual nominations for Best Supporting Actor for his performances in Biwi No.1 and Taal, winning for the latter.

Sushmita Sen received dual nominations for Best Supporting Actress for her performances in Biwi No.1 and Sirf Tum, winning for the former.

Awards 

The winners and nominees have been listed below. Winners are listed first, highlighted in boldface, and indicated with a double dagger.

Popular Awards

Technical Awards

Special Awards

Superlatives

References

External links

2000 Indian film awards
IIFA awards